Lights...Camera...Revolution! is the fifth studio album by American crossover thrash band Suicidal Tendencies, released in 1990. This was the band's first release with bassist Robert Trujillo and their last studio album with drummer R.J. Herrera.

Music and lyrics
This album shows the band straying further away from their roots as a crossover thrash band and moving towards a traditional thrash metal style. The song arrangements are more complex, as are the lyrics. This was also the first Suicidal Tendencies album to display heavy funk influences, which can be attributed to the input of then-new bassist Robert Trujillo.

Cover art
The album cover was taken at the Vista Theatre located at 4473 Sunset Drive in Los Feliz. It shows Mike Clark, R. J. Herrera and Robert Trujillo standing on top of the theater behind the "Vista" sign, while Rocky George and Mike Muir appear on the top right window of the building.

Release and reception

Singles from this album included "You Can't Bring Me Down", "Send Me Your Money", "Alone" and "Lovely". The video for "You Can't Bring Me Down" received much MTV airplay, and was largely responsible for the success of this album. It was certified gold a few years later. It was also nominated for the "Best Metal Performance" Grammy Award in 1991, losing to "Stone Cold Crazy" by Metallica, whom Trujillo would join in 2003. Loudwire's Eduardo Rivadavia later ranked Lights...Camera...Revolution! at number eight on their top ten list of "Thrash Albums NOT Released by the Big 4".

AllMusic's Alex Henderson described the record as "one of its [the band's] best albums ever" and "a disc that no Suicidal fan should be without," further writing: "Not since the mid-'80s had the L.A. band sounded this confident, focused and inspired." The Village Voice critic Robert Christgau noted the track "You Can't Bring Me Down" as a choice cut from the album.

Track listing

Credits
 Mike Muir – lead vocals
 Rocky George – lead guitar, backing vocals
 Mike Clark – rhythm guitar, backing vocals
 Robert Trujillo – bass, backing vocals
 R. J. Herrera – drums
 Recorded at Rumbo Recorders, Canoga Park, California, and Amigo Studios, Hollywood, California
 Produced by Mark Dodson and Suicidal Tendencies
 Engineered and mixed by Mark Dodson
 Additionally engineered by Chris Steinmetz, Brian Scheuble, Greg Goldman, and Andy Udoff
 Mixed at A&M Recording Studio, Hollywood, California

Chart positions

References

Suicidal Tendencies albums
1990 albums
Epic Records albums
Albums produced by Mark Dodson